The International Young Democrat Union (IYDU) is a global alliance of centre-right political youth organisations and the youth wing of the International Democrat Union.

The IYDU in its current form was founded in March 1991 in Washington, D.C.  A previous organisation of the same name had been established in July 1981, also in Washington, but subsequently ceased to exist.

The IYDU fights for conservative and free-market policies worldwide.

IYDU host a number of events for member organisations each year including a Freedom Forum (mid-year), an Annual Council Meeting, and overseas study visits.

Following almost 6 years of the IYDU being split over differences in the interpretation of the IYDU constitution, the International Young Democrat Union Joint Council Meeting elected a unified IYDU Board in Brussels on 21 October 2017.

Principles
"The International Young Democrat Union is a global alliance of centre-right political youth organisations united by a common desire for greater freedom and less government.

First established in 1981, two years before its parent organisation the International Democrat Union (IDU), then re-established in 1991, the IYDU has grow from 14 members to 127, from more than 81 different nations. Our membership is diverse. We come from a rich array of histories, cultures and political traditions, but we are united by a shared commitment to freedom, and to fighting socialism. Some of us come from established democracies with deep-rooted beliefs in individual freedom and liberty; some have experienced first-hand the destructive evil of communism; others are still fighting for basic freedoms.

Throughout the year the IYDU hosts a number of events around the world. Current and future leaders network, discuss ideology, share ideas and build friendships. Our events include a Freedom Forum in the middle of the year, a Study Trip, and a Council Meeting held towards the end/start of the calendar year.

Becoming involved in IYDU demonstrates a commitment: to a better world, created through genuine democratic process. Participants at our conferences have progressed to become cabinet ministers, members of parliament, senior advisers and leaders within their respective industries in public and private sectors."

Parent organisation
The parent organisation to IYDU, the International Democrat Union (IDU) is a working association of 71 full and associate members from 63 different countries. Formed in 1983, founder members included Britain's Prime Minister Margaret Thatcher; US Vice-President George H. W. Bush; Mayor of Paris, and later French President, Jacques Chirac; and German Chancellor Helmut Kohl.

Chairmen

Board 2021
 Chairman:
: Michael Dust (Junge Union)

 Deputy Chairman:
: Dorcas Francis (Bavicha)

 Secretary General:
: Nick Francis (NDP)

 Deputy Secretary General:

: Josh Manuatu (Young Liberals)

 Treasurer:
: Syrilla Makarezou (ONNED – Greece)

 Vice-Chairs: 
 Martin Cesar (PRO)

 Marwa El Ansari (Istiqlal)

 Fredrik Hultman (MUF)

 Nicola Richards MP (Young Conservatives)

 Lilit Beglaryan (YRPA)

 Hikmat Jung Karki (NDYO)

 Rick Loughery (YRNF)

 Sourabh Choudhary (BJP)

 Isabella Tymviou (NEDISY)

 Nana Asafo Adjei Ayeh (NPP)

Co-Opted Vice-Chairs:  
 Thomas Belligh (Jong CD&V)

 Javier Molina (RN)

 Virgilio Falco (EDS / Italy)

 Kendron Christopher (JLP)

 Glen De Waele (Jong N-VA)

 Heidi Hanhela (KNL)

 Eduardo Lacayo (ARENA)

 Jose Montero Limao (JP CDS-PP)

 Patricia De Guzman (PSC)

 Roberto Pellizzaro (Forza Italia Giovani)

 Falah Hasan (KDP – Kurdistan Region)

 Eva Dohalova (JVP)

Members
Current IYDU members are (as of November 21, 2022):
 : One Anguilla Youth
 : Young PRO
 : Young Republicans of Armenia
 : Australian Liberal Students Federation, Young Liberals
 : Young People's Party
 : NIPA Youth
 : Jong CD&V, Jong NV-A
 : United Democratic Party Youth
 : Juventud Demócratas (MDS)
 : Juventude Democratas
 : MSDS
 : Young Conservatives
 : Youth National Renewal, New Generations of Independent Democratic Union
 : New Generations of Conservative Party
 : Youth of National Integration Party
 : Protoporia, Youth of the Democratic Rally (NEDISY)
 : Young Conservatives, Young Civic Democrats
 : Young Conservatives (KU), Konservativ Studentere (KS)
 : Young Freedom Movement
 : Juventud la 6
 : ARENA Youth
 : Res Publica (IRL)
 : Youth of the European People's Party (YEPP), European Young Conservatives (EYC), European Democrat Students (EDS), Nordic Young Conservative Union (NUU), Nordic Conservative Student Union (NKSU), Democratic Youth Community of Europe (DEMYC) 
 : Kokoomusnuoret (KNL)
 : Mouvement des etudiants
 : Junge Union (JU)
 : Youth League of the New Patriotic Party
 : Youth Organisation of New Democracy (ONNED), DAP – NDFK
 : New National Party Youth
 : Juventud Unionista
 : Juventud Nacionalista
 : Fidelitas
 : Chaldo Assyrian, KDYU (in Kurdistan)
 : Youth LIKUD
 : Forza Italia Giovani
 : Young Jamaica — Generation 2000
 : Lebanese Forces Students Association
 : TS-LKD Jaunimo Bendruomene
 : MDP Youth Wing
 : Democratic Youth Union
 : PZP Youth
 : Istiqlal Youth
 : National Democratic Youth Organisation
 : CDJA
 : Young Nationals
 : Juventud Conservadora Nacional
 : Young Conservatives (Unge Høyre), Hoyers Studenterforbund
 : Juventud Popular Cristiana
 : Mlodzi Demokraci
 : People's Youth, Juventude Social Democrata
 : Christian Democratic Youth of Slovakia (KDMS)
 : New Generations of the People's Party (NNGG)
 : United Youth Front
 : People’s Action Movement Youth
 : United Youth
 : Young Democrats
 : Moderate Youth League (MUF), Young Christian Democrats (KDU), Fria Moderata Studentforbundet
 : Young Swiss People's Party
 : Kuomintang Youth League
 : Chadema Youth
 : Forum for Democratic Change Youth
 : Young Conservatives, Young Conservatives Scotland
 : College Republicans, Young Republicans National Federation
 : Primero Justicia, Proyecto Venezuela

Former members 
 : Forumi Rinor i Partisë Demokratike
 : Young Nationals
 : Youth Acción Demócratica Nacionalista
 : Young Civic Democrats
 : Juventud de Alianza Republicana Nacionalista
 : The Young Republicans
 : Bharatiya Janata Yuva Morcha 
 : Young Independents
 : Junge Generation
 : Youth of the Democratic Party of Kenia
 : Youth of the Democratic Change (observer)
 : Youth of the Democratic Party
 : Youth Colorado Party

Footnotes

 
Youth wings of political parties
1991 establishments in Washington, D.C.
Political organizations established in 1991